Judge Scott may refer to:

Charles R. Scott (1904–1983), judge of the United States District Court for the Middle District of Florida
George Cromwell Scott (1864–1948), judge of the United States District Court for the Northern District of Iowa
Hugh B. Scott (born 1949), magistrate judge of United States District Court for the Western District of New York
Irene F. Scott (1912–1997), judge of the United States Tax Court
Jeanne E. Scott (1948—2019), judge of the United States District Court for the Central District of Illinois
Nauman Scott (1916–2001), judge of the United States District Court for the Western District of Louisiana
Thomas Scott (Florida judge) (born 1948), judge of the United States District Court for the Southern District of Florida

See also
Justice Scott (disambiguation)